The 2016–17 North Dakota Fighting Hawks Men's Basketball team represented the University of North Dakota during the 2016–17 NCAA Division I men's basketball season. The Fighting Hawks, led by 11th-year head coach Brian Jones, played their home games at the Betty Engelstad Sioux Center in Grand Forks, North Dakota as members of the Big Sky Conference. They finished the season 22–10, 14–4 in Big Sky play to win the Big Sky regular season championship. In the Big Sky tournament, they defeated Portland State, Idaho, and Weber State to win the tournament championship. As a result, they received the conference's automatic bid to the NCAA tournament. As a No. 15 seed in the West region, they lost to No. 2-seeded and No. 4-ranked Arizona in the first round.

Previous season
The Fighting Hawks finished the 2015–16 season 17–16, 10–8 in Big Sky play to finish in a tie for fifth place. They defeated Southern Utah and Idaho State to advance to the semifinals of the Big Sky tournament where they lost to Weber State. They were invited to the CollegeInsider.com Tournament where they lost in the first round to UC Irvine.

Offseason

Departures

Incoming transfers

2016 recruiting class

2017 incoming recruits

Roster

Schedule and results

|-
!colspan=9 style=| Non-conference regular season

|-
!colspan=9 style=| Big Sky regular season

|-
!colspan=9 style=| Big Sky tournament

|-
!colspan=9 style=| NCAA tournament

References

North Dakota Fighting Hawks men's basketball seasons
North Dakota
North Dakota
Fight
Fight